Buettneria can refer to:

Anaschisma, an extinct genus of large temnospondyl amphibian, originally described as Buettneria, a name later found to be preoccupied
 Buettneria (katydid), a genus of bush crickets or katydids in the family Tettigoniidae, subfamily Phaneropterinae
 Buettneria (gastropod), a genus of land snails in the family Urocyclidae